With or Without You is a 2015 Hong Kong period historical fiction comedy drama produced by TVB, starring Bobby Au-Yeung and Joey Meng as the main leads. Filming took place from October 2014 to February 2015 on location in Hong Kong and China Central Television Wuxi Film & Television Base. The drama is broadcast on Hong Kong's Jade and HD Jade channels from 26 October till 6 December 2015 every Monday through Friday during its 8:30–9:30 pm timeslot with a total of 30 episodes.

The drama is a fictional telling of Song dynasty poet Su Shi and is the last of TVB's four 2015 grand anniversary dramas to be broadcast.

Synopsis
The drama is a fictional account of the family life of Song dynasty poet Su Shi also known as So Tung Po.

Unable to forget his late wife, So Tung Po (Bobby Au Yeung) has refused to remarry until he meets talented female chef Wong Yun Chi (Joey Meng) who wins him over with her cooking. Thinking life will get better, he marries Yun Chi, but after marriage the two constantly bicker and Tung Po's son from his first marriage does not accept his new step mother .

Besides his own marriage Tung Po is also concerned with his youngest sister So Siu Mui's (Jacqueline Wong) love life since he believes her flirtatious boyfriend Chun Siu Yau (Vincent Wong) will eventually leave her and break her heart. Also his other younger sister So Dai Mui (Harriet Yeung), who still has not gotten over her first love that is now married to someone else.

So Dai Mui finally marries with Tung Po's friend, Chan Kwai Sheung. They were lovers when Kwai Sheung was working in a temple. However that time he chose another one to marry. But the wife he marries is shrewish and claimed by Tung Po as "the lioness of Hedong". And eventually he is separated from his wife and be with Dai Mui.

Before marrying Siu Mui, Siu Yau told Tung Po a secret he's been keeping from Siu Mui. Siu Yau is a divorced man, with a divorce certificate he showed to Tung Po. However, his ex-wife returns to seek him after knowing he's already been the Champion of Keju. She lies to everybody that she is unaware of the divorce certificate. To not break her heart, Siu Mui chooses to serve Siu Yau with her. However Tung Po and Jeon Chi finally discover her she has been lying to everyone except her parents for a long time. She re-separate with Siu Yau.

Siu Yau goes to Silkworm Village for a working journey. He goes investigating the plague happened in the silkworm village since he used to help the villagers there. The plague is caused people to act as zombies. The plague was from Wong On Shek while he was planted the virus with an injury after he was fired by the emperor. Siu Yau found it in the medical classics knowing the plague is so call Baak Bin Ku and make up the antidote. When he and Siu Mui are both in illness, Tung Po save them with the antidote. This makes Wong On Shek and So Tung Po end with their argument.

The Emperor was dating with Kum Chow who is a famous prostitute in the Capital. She was introduced by Tung Po to the emperor. Underneath the prostitute's cover, she is actually a spy from the Kingdom of Liao. She set a lot of traps, and the plague is one of them.

Cast

So family
Bobby Au-Yeung as So Tung Po, a famous poet and officer in Song dynasty
Joey Meng as Wong Yun Zhi, Tung po's younger cousin-sister-in-law and wife later.
Jimmy Au as So Chit, Tung Po's younger brother, also a poet and officer.
Harriet Yeung as So Tai Mui, one of the two Tung Po's younger sisters, So Siu Mui's elder sister. Chan Kwai Sheung's concubine.
Jacqueline Wong as So Siu Mui, Tung Po's youngest sister, Chun Shiu Yau's wife and later the equivalent wife (a kind of old-fashioned marriage relationship in China), good in martial arts and couplets.
Vincent Wong as Chun Shiu Yau, another famous poet in Song dynasty. Tung Po's younger brother-in-law, So Siu Mui's husband, not only good in literature, but also martial arts.
Lam Wing Yu
Wong Yee Kam

Chan family
Tyson Chak as Chan Kwai Sheung, Tung Po's best friend, he is historically famous for his fear of his cruel wife. He's So Tai Mui's ex-lover. Tai Mui and Yin-hung's lover.
Alice Chan as Lau Yuet O, Chan's wife, historically famous by her husband describing her as a lion from the east of Yellow River in Chinese idiom 河東獅吼

Song dynasty Royals and Officials 
Jonathan Cheung as Song Shenzong, the emperor.
Mary Hon as the empress dowager
Leanne Li as Shau-On State Princess, ex-master for Kwai Sheung's wife Lau Yuet O and Tung Po's wife Yun Zhi.
Pal Sinn as Wong on Shek, a famous reformer and poet in the Song Dynasty.
Kevin Yau
Joan Lee

Extended cast
Sire Ma as Kum Chow, a prostitute and spy from the Liao State
Akina Hong as So Chit's wife, she is also the servant of Kum Chow
Becky Lee as Shuk Mei, Mrs. What, Shiu Yau's ex-wife and later wife, a liar too
Dickson Lee as Hung Sei, a captor and Shiu Yau's friend
Joseph Yeung
Chan Wing Chun
Bob Cheung
Joel Chan
Ceci So as Shiu Yau's mother-in-law
Wong Chun as Shiu Yau's father-in-law
Albert Law as Ching Chi-Coi, Tung Po's ex-brother-in-law and Kum Chow's servant
Lily Li
Lydia Law
Ally Tse
Wong Hong Kiu
Roxanne Tong as Yin-Hung, a prostitute in Luk Ming Yuen. Tung Po's friend, Chan Kwai-sheung's mistress
Glen Lee as Wong Pong, the elder son of Wong On Shek
Suki Lam
Ivana Wong (王舒銳) as Wong Yun Zhi's servant

Development 

The costume fitting ceremony and blessing ceremony was held on 30 October 2014 at 12:30 pm Tseung Kwan O TVB City Studio One Common Room.
Filming took place from October 2014 to February 2015 on location in Hong Kong and China Central Television Wuxi Film & Television Base.
In March 2014, With or Without You was one of ten TVB dramas previewed at FILMART 2014.
A promo image of With or Without You was featured in TVB's 2015 calendar for the month of September.

Viewership ratings

*19 November 2015: No episode was broadcast due to live airing of 2015 TVB Anniversary Gala.

International broadcast

Awards and nominations

References

External links
TVB Official Website

TVB dramas
Hong Kong television series
2015 Hong Kong television series debuts
2015 Hong Kong television series endings
2010s Hong Kong television series